Gunnar Samuelsson (2 May 1927 – 4 November 2007) was a Swedish cross-country skier. He competed at the 1956 Winter Olympics and won a bronze medal in the 4 × 10 km relay, finishing 11th and 15th in the individual 15 km and 30 km races.

At the end of his career Samuelsson competed in biathlon and won silver and bronze medal in the Swedish Championships and relay title in an international meet against East Germany.

Cross-country skiing results

Olympic Games
 1 medal – (1 bronze)

References

External links
Swedish Cross country skiing medalists 1924–2002 

1927 births
2007 deaths
People from Malung-Sälen Municipality
Cross-country skiers from Dalarna County
Swedish male cross-country skiers
Cross-country skiers at the 1956 Winter Olympics
Olympic cross-country skiers of Sweden
Olympic bronze medalists for Sweden
Olympic medalists in cross-country skiing
Medalists at the 1956 Winter Olympics